Benno Saelens (born 11 January 1948) is a Belgian volleyball player. He competed in the men's tournament at the 1968 Summer Olympics.

References

External links
 

1948 births
Living people
Belgian men's volleyball players
Olympic volleyball players of Belgium
Volleyball players at the 1968 Summer Olympics
People from Menen
Sportspeople from West Flanders